Fasano is a railway station near the Italian town of Fasano, in the Province of Brindisi, Apulia. The station lies on the Adriatic Railway (Ancona–Lecce) and was opened in 1866. The train services are operated by Trenitalia.

Train services
The station is served by the following service(s):

Intercity services Bologna - Rimini - Ancona - Pescara - Foggia - Bari - Brindisi - Lecce
Night train (Intercity Night) Rome - Foggia - Bari - Brindisi - Lecce
Night train (Intercity Night) Milan - Parma - Bologna - Ancona - Pescara - Foggia - Bari - Brindisi - Lecce
Night train (Intercity Night) Turin - Alessandria - Bologna - Ancona - Pescara - Foggia - Bari - Brindisi - Lecce
Regional services (Treno regionale) Bari - Monopoli - Brindisi - Lecce

See also
Railway stations in Italy
List of railway stations in Apulia
Rail transport in Italy
History of rail transport in Italy

External links

This article is based upon a translation of the Italian language version as at May 2014.

Railway stations in Apulia
Station
Railway stations opened in 1866
Buildings and structures in the Province of Brindisi
1866 establishments in Italy
Railway stations in Italy opened in the 19th century